The Marvel Cinematic Universe is a media franchise and shared fictional universe that is the setting of superhero films produced by Marvel Studios, based on characters that appear in Marvel Comics publications. Phase One of the franchise includes six films, featuring four different superhero properties, leading up to a crossover in the 2012 film Marvel's The Avengers. The franchise's Phase Two features three sequels to Phase One films, as well as two new film properties, and the crossover Avengers: Age of Ultron, which released in 2015. Phase Three features four sequels to earlier films, and four new film properties, as well as the crossover films Avengers: Infinity War (2018) and Avengers: Endgame (2019). The films from Phase One through Phase Three are collectively known as "The Infinity Saga".

As the franchise is composed of films adapted from a variety of Marvel Comics properties, there are multiple lead actors: Robert Downey Jr. stars as Tony Stark / Iron Man in the films Iron Man (2008), Iron Man 2 (2010), and Iron Man 3 (2013); Chris Evans portrays Steve Rogers / Captain America in Captain America: The First Avenger (2011), Captain America: The Winter Soldier (2014), and Captain America: Civil War (2016), where he is joined by Downey as Stark; and Chris Hemsworth plays Thor in Thor (2011), Thor: The Dark World (2013), and Thor: Ragnarok (2017). All three actors star in The Avengers (2012), and reprise their roles in Avengers: Age of Ultron (2015), Avengers: Infinity War (2018), and Avengers: Endgame (2019). Edward Norton headlined The Incredible Hulk (2008), playing Bruce Banner / Hulk, but did not reprise the role in future films, being replaced by Mark Ruffalo for all subsequent films involving the character. Chris Pratt portrays the lead character, Peter Quill / Star-Lord, in Guardians of the Galaxy (2014), and returns for its sequel, Guardians of the Galaxy Vol. 2 (2017), while Paul Rudd and Michael Douglas respectively star as Scott Lang / Ant-Man and Hank Pym / Ant-Man in Ant-Man (2015) and Ant-Man and the Wasp (2018), in which Evangeline Lilly co-stars as Hope van Dyne / Wasp.

Benedict Cumberbatch portrays Stephen Strange in Doctor Strange (2016), Tom Holland portrays Peter Parker / Spider-Man in Spider-Man: Homecoming (2017) and Spider-Man: Far From Home (2019), and Chadwick Boseman portrayed T'Challa / Black Panther in Black Panther (2018); Holland and Boseman were both introduced in Captain America: Civil War, which Rudd also appeared in. Downey and Evans join Holland in Spider-Man: Homecoming, while Ruffalo and Cumberbatch join Hemsworth in Thor: Ragnarok. Brie Larson portrays Carol Danvers / Captain Marvel in Captain Marvel (2019). Pratt, Cumberbatch, Holland and Boseman also appear in Avengers: Infinity War and Avengers: Endgame, with Rudd, Lilly and Larson also appearing in the latter.

Samuel L. Jackson had cameo and supporting appearances as Nick Fury in several of the early films in the franchise, before co-starring in The Avengers; he would continue to have supporting roles in later films as well. Jeremy Renner and Scarlett Johansson had supporting roles as Clint Barton / Hawkeye and Natasha Romanoff / Black Widow respectively in multiple films in the saga besides their leading roles in the Avengers films. Josh Brolin was cast as the saga's overarching villain Thanos for Guardians of the Galaxy, after the character first appeared at the end of The Avengers portrayed by Damion Poitier. Multiple other cast members recur across multiple films and series within the franchise. The list below is sorted by film and the character's surname, as some characters have been portrayed by multiple actors. All characters that have made appearances in other MCU media, such as the short films, television series, or digital series, are noted.

Phase One

Phase Two

Phase Three

See also
Marvel Cinematic Universe film actors
Marvel One-Shot actors
Marvel Studios television series actors
WHIH Newsfront actors
The Daily Bugle actors
Marvel Television series actors
Agents of S.H.I.E.L.D.: Slingshot actors
Stan Lee cameos

Notes

References

External links
Official Marvel Studios 10 year anniversary celebration "class photo", at Marvel.com

Phase One films
Full cast and crew for Iron Man at IMDb
Full cast and crew for The Incredible Hulk at IMDb
Full cast and crew for Iron Man 2 at IMDb
Full cast and crew for Thor at IMDb
Full cast and crew for Captain America: The First Avenger at IMDb
Full cast and crew for Marvel's The Avengers at IMDb

Phase Two films
Full cast and crew for Iron Man 3 at IMDb
Full cast and crew for Thor: The Dark World at IMDb
Full cast and crew for Captain America: The Winter Soldier at IMDb
Full cast and crew for Guardians of the Galaxy at IMDb
Full cast and crew for Avengers: Age of Ultron at IMDb
Full cast and crew for Ant-Man at IMDb

Phase Three films
Full cast and crew for Captain America: Civil War at IMDb
Full cast and crew for Doctor Strange at IMDb
Full cast and crew for Guardians of the Galaxy Vol. 2 at IMDb
Full cast and crew for Spider-Man: Homecoming at IMDb
Full cast and crew for Thor: Ragnarok at IMDb
Full cast and crew for Black Panther at IMDb
Full cast and crew for Avengers: Infinity War at IMDb
Full cast and crew for Ant-Man and the Wasp at IMDb
Full cast and crew for Captain Marvel at IMDb
Full cast and crew for Avengers: Endgame at IMDb
Full cast and crew for Spider-Man: Far From Home at IMDb

Lists of actors by film series

Film Infinity Saga actors